Cormocephalus rubriceps, also known as the Hura or giant centipede, is a large centipede of the family Scolopendridae. It is native to Australia and New Zealand, where it is found in the North Island and on islands off the North Island. At up to 25 cm in length, it is the largest centipede in New Zealand.

Taxonomy

This species was given its Latin name by George Newport in 1843 as Scolopendra rubriceps. Newport published a description of the species under that name in 1845.

References

External links

 TerraNature
 LandCare
 Massey University Soil Bugs
 CSIRO

rubriceps
Centipedes of Australia
Centipedes of New Zealand
Animals described in 1843